Ganea may refer to:

People
Cristian Ganea (born 1992), Romanian football striker
Ionel Ganea (born 1973), Romanian football striker
Liviu Ganea (born 1988), Romanian football striker
Tudor Ganea (1922–1971), Romanian mathematician

Other people
Eilenberg–Ganea conjecture, a claim in algebraic topology
Ganea conjecture, a claim in algebraic topology, now disproved

Romanian-language surnames